George William Clarke (10 April 1869 – 26 August 1955) was an English cricketer.  Clarke's batting and bowling styles are unknown.  He was born at Northampton, Northamptonshire.

Clarke made a single first-class appearance for Northamptonshire against Kent in the 1908 County Championship.  In Northamptonshire's first-innings he was run out for a duck, while in their second-innings he was dismissed for the same score by Punter Humphreys.  With the ball, Clarke took the wickets of Frank Woolley and Arthur Fielder.

He died at the town of his birth on 26 August 1955.

References

External links
George Clarke at ESPNcricinfo
George Clarke at CricketArchive

1869 births
1955 deaths
Cricketers from Northampton
English cricketers
Northamptonshire cricketers